Dinagat Islands's at-large congressional district is the sole congressional district of the Philippines in the province of Dinagat Islands. It was created ahead of the 2007 Philippine House of Representatives elections following the separation of the islands from Surigao del Norte in 2006. The province has been electing a single representative provincewide at-large to the House of Representatives from the 14th Congress onwards. It is currently represented in the 18th Congress by Alan Ecleo of the Lakas–CMD.

Representation history

See also
Legislative districts of Dinagat Islands

References

Congressional districts of the Philippines
Politics of Dinagat Islands
2006 establishments in the Philippines
At-large congressional districts of the Philippines
Congressional districts of Caraga
Constituencies established in 2006